Mirabella estevesii, synonym Cereus estevesii, is a species of columnar cactus found in  Minas Gerais, Brazil.

References

External links

Cactoideae
Flora of Southeast Brazil